The Hatfield–McCoy Trails, located in West Virginia, is a nationally known trail system most popular for its off-highway vehicle trails.  The trail system is a multi-county project, including the West Virginia counties of Logan, Kanawha, Wyoming, McDowell, Mercer, Wayne, Lincoln, Mingo, and Boone.  The trails are managed by the Hatfield–McCoy Regional Recreation Authority, a legislatively created quasi-state agency and its paid staff, which is governed by a multi-county board of directors.

The name of the trail system is derived from the names of two families, the Hatfields and McCoys, who famously feuded near the West Virginia and Kentucky border after the Civil War.

Leff Moore originated the idea of the trail system and was its first executive director. He was followed by Mike and Mark Whitt, Matthew Ballard, and Jeffrey T. Lusk in leading the trails' expansion.

Expansion

In 2002, the trail system added an additional  of trails in Boone County, West Virginia. Currently there are six of the nine West Virginia counties (Wyoming, McDowell, Mercer, Mingo, Logan, and Boone) with over 600 miles of off-highway vehicle (OHV) trails. An expansion plan for the trail system plans for 2,000 miles of trails with suitable facilities and an Off-Highway Vehicle Park located in Kanawha County (CBER 2006).

Current trail system names (trailhead facility names in parentheses) include Rockhouse (Man/Gilbert), Bearwallow (Logan), Pinnacle Creek (Castlerock), Little Coal River (Water Ways), Indian Ridge (Ashland), Pocahontas (Bramwell), and Buffalo Mountain (Delbarton).  Only Paiute ATV Trail in Central Utah has more miles of trails (2000)

As of October 19, 2015, Little Coal River and Ivy Branch trails are closed as land changed ownership.

Uses

The trail system caters to ATV, UATV, and motorbikes (dirt bikes), but hikers, mountain bikers, and horse riders can also use the trails.

The trail system staff not only markets the trail system globally, but also builds, maps, and maintains the trail system.  Law enforcement officers patrol the trail to assure compliance with safety regulations.  Motorized users of the trail system must wear a DOT-approved helmet and are prohibited from "doubling" (having a passenger), unless their vehicle is designed for two people. These rules, and a host of others, have allowed the trail system to enjoy a quality safety record, despite an increase in ATV-related injuries around the country.

External links 
 Hatfield–McCoy Trails

ATVs
Tourist attractions in Boone County, West Virginia
Tourist attractions in Logan County, West Virginia
Tourist attractions in Kanawha County, West Virginia
Tourist attractions in Mercer County, West Virginia
Tourist attractions in Mingo County, West Virginia
Tourist attractions in Lincoln County, West Virginia
Tourist attractions in McDowell County, West Virginia
Tourist attractions in Wayne County, West Virginia
Tourist attractions in Wyoming County, West Virginia
Sports in West Virginia